Charaxes ephyra is a butterfly in the family Nymphalidae. It is found in West Africa. (Angola, Sierra Leone)

Taxonomy
Synonym for Charaxes etheocles.

References

External links
Images of C. ephyra Royal Museum for Central Africa (Albertine Rift Project)
African Butterfly Database Range map via search

Butterflies described in 1824
ephyra